Peñitas is a U.S. city in Hidalgo County, Texas. The population was 6,103 at the 2020 census, up from 1,167 at the 2000 census. It is part of the McAllen–Edinburg–Mission and Reynosa–McAllen metropolitan areas.

Geography

Peñitas is located in southwestern Hidalgo County at  (26.231111, –98.445000). It is bordered to the west by the city of La Joya. U.S. Route 83 runs through Peñitas, leading east  to McAllen and west  to Rio Grande City.

Demographics

2020 census

As of the 2020 United States census, there were 6,460 people, 1,537 households, and 1,400 families residing in the city.

2000 census
As of the census of 2000, there were 1,167 people, 319 households, and 279 families residing in the city. The population density was 582.1 people per square mile (225.3/km). There were 421 housing units at an average density of 210.0/sq mi (81.3/km). The ethnic makeup of the city was 83.29% White, 0.09% African American, 0.09% Native American, 16.20% from other races, and 0.34% from two or more ethnicities. Hispanic or Latino of any ethnicity were 98.03% of the population.

There were 319 households, out of which 48.9% had children under the age of 18 living with them, 73.7% were married couples living together, 10.7% had a female householder with no husband present, and 12.5% were non-families. 10.3% of all households were made up of individuals, and 6.3% had someone living alone who was 65 years of age or older. The average household size was 3.66 and the average family size was 3.99.

In the city, the population was spread out, with 32.9% under the age of 18, 10.5% from 18 to 24, 27.8% from 25 to 44, 19.6% from 45 to 64, and 9.1% who were 65 years of age or older. The median age was 29 years. For every 100 females, there were 91.0 males. For every 100 females age 18 and over, there were 86.4 males.

The median income for a household in the city was $26,071, and the median income for a family was $28,355. Males had a median income of $21,932 versus $14,583 for females. The per capita income for the city was $8,500. About 25.4% of families and 28.2% of the population were below the poverty line, including 32.9% of those under age 18 and 28.0% of those age 65 or over.

Education
Peñitas is served by the La Joya Independent School District. Schools include JFK Elementary School, C. Chavez Middle School, and La Joya High School.

In addition, South Texas Independent School District operates magnet schools that serve the community.

Government and infrastructure
The United States Postal Service operates the Peñitas Post Office.

References

External links
City of Peñitas official website

Cities in Hidalgo County, Texas
Cities in Texas